August 16 - Eastern Orthodox liturgical calendar - August 18

All fixed commemorations below are observed on August 30 by Orthodox Churches on the Old Calendar.

For August 17, Orthodox Churches on the Old Calendar commemorate the Saints listed on August 4.

Feasts

 Afterfeast of the Dormition.

Saints

 Hieromartyr Myron of Cyzicus, Priest (250)
 Martyrs Thyrsus, Leucius, and Callinicus (Coronatus), with others, of Caesarea in Bithynia (c. 250)  (see also: December 14)
 Martyrs Paul and his sister Juliana, and Quadratus, Acacius and Stratonicus the executioners, at Ptolemais in Syria (273)  (see also: March 4)
 Martyrs Straton, Philip, Eutychian, and Cyprian, of Nicomedia (303)
 Venerable Monk-martyr Macarius of Mount St. Auxentius (768)
 Venerable Elias the Younger of Calabria, (Elias of Enna) (903)
 Venerable Aiglon, a hermit who lived ascetically and reposed in peace.

Pre-Schism Western saints

 Saint Eusebius, a Greek by birth, reposed in exile in Sicily (310)
 Saint Theodulus of Grammont (Theodore, Yoder), an early Bishop of Valais, who was much revered in Switzerland and Savoy (4th century)
 Hieromartyrs Liberatus, Boniface, Servus, Rusticus, Rogatus, Septimus, and Maximus, under the Arian King Hunneric (483)
 Saint Anastasius of Terni, Bishop of Terni in Italy (c. 553)
 Saint James the Deacon, companion of St Paulinus of York in his mission to Northumbria (after 671)  (see also: October18)
 Saint Drithelm, monk at Melrose Abbey in Scotland, Confessor, great ascetic (c. 700)
 Saint Carloman, eldest son of Charles Martel, became King of Austrasia (754)
 Saint Amor (Amator, Amour), companion of St Pirmin in preaching Christ in Germany, founder of the monastery of Amorbach in Franconia (8th century)
 Martyr Patroclus of Troyes, under Aurelian (270-275)  (see also: January 21)
 Hieromartyr Jeroen (Hiero, Iero), hieromonk, at Noordwijk, Netherlands (857)
 Saint Benedicta and Cecilia, two daughters of the King of Lorraine, became nuns and successively Abbesses of Susteren Abbey, in the Rhineland, Germany (10th century)

Post-Schism Orthodox saints

 Venerable Alypius the Iconographer, of the Kiev Caves Monastery (1114)
 Saint Tbeli Abuserisdze of Khikhuni, Adjara (13th century)
 Venerable Leucius, Abbot of Volokolamsk (1492)  (see also: April 7)
 Blessed Theodoretus, Enlightener of the Laps in Solovki (1571)
 Saint Philip of Mt. Yankov Monastery, left bank of Sukhona River in Vologda, monk (1662)
 New Monk-martyr Agapius, at Thermes, near Thessalonica (1752)
 Venerable Monk-martyr Demetrius of Samarina (Pindos), at Ioannina (1808)  (see also: August 18)
 Saint Pimen, Archimandrite, of Ugreshi Monastery (1880)
 Saint George the Pilgrim (Gheorghe Lazăr the Ascetic), of Piatra Neamț, in eastern Romania (1916)

New martyrs and confessors

 New Hieromartyr Alexis Velikoselsky, Priest (1918)
 New Hieromartyr Demetrius Ostroumov, Priest (1937)

Other commemorations

 Repose of Schemanun Ardaliona of Ust-Medveditsky Convent (1864)
 Repose of Schemamonk Onuphrius of Valaam Monastery (1912)

Icons

 Icon of the Most Holy Theotokos of "Armatia", Constantinople.  (see also: July 21)
 Icon of the Most Holy Theotokos of "Svensk" (1288)
 Icon of Panagia of Goumenissa.  (see also: February 2)

Icon gallery

Notes

References

Sources
 August 17 / August 30. Orthodox Calendar (PRAVOSLAVIE.RU).
 August 30 / August 17. Holy Trinity Russian Orthodox Church (A parish of the Patriarchate of Moscow).
 August 17. OCA - The Lives of the Saints.
 The Autonomous Orthodox Metropolia of Western Europe and the Americas (ROCOR). St. Hilarion Calendar of Saints for the year of our Lord 2004. St. Hilarion Press (Austin, TX). pp. 60–61.
 Menologion: The Seventeenth Day Day of the Month of August. Orthodoxy in China.
 August 17. Latin Saints of the Orthodox Patriarchate of Rome.
 The Roman Martyrology. Transl. by the Archbishop of Baltimore. Last Edition, According to the Copy Printed at Rome in 1914. Revised Edition, with the Imprimatur of His Eminence Cardinal Gibbons. Baltimore: John Murphy Company, 1916. pp. 246–247.
 Rev. Richard Stanton. A Menology of England and Wales, or, Brief Memorials of the Ancient British and English Saints Arranged According to the Calendar, Together with the Martyrs of the 16th and 17th Centuries. London: Burns & Oates, 1892. pp. 396–397.

 Greek Sources
 Great Synaxaristes:  17 ΑΥΓΟΥΣΤΟΥ. ΜΕΓΑΣ ΣΥΝΑΞΑΡΙΣΤΗΣ.
  Συναξαριστής. 17 Αυγούστου. ECCLESIA.GR. (H ΕΚΚΛΗΣΙΑ ΤΗΣ ΕΛΛΑΔΟΣ).

 Russian Sources
  30 августа (17 августа). Православная Энциклопедия под редакцией Патриарха Московского и всея Руси Кирилла (электронная версия). (Orthodox Encyclopedia - Pravenc.ru).

August in the Eastern Orthodox calendar